This is filmography of B. Saroja Devi, who has acted in Tamil, Kannada, Telugu, and Hindi films. She has around 200 films to her credit.

Filmography

1950s

1960s

1970s

1980s

1990s

2000s-present

TV shows

References

Indian filmographies
Actress filmographies